The following is a partial list of songs performed by Lead Belly.  Lead Belly, born Huddie Ledbetter, was an American folk and blues musician active in the 1930s and 1940s.

"4, 5 & 9"
"Abraham Lincoln"
"Ain't Goin Down the Well No More"
"Ain't Gonna Drink No More"
"Ain't Gonna Study War No More
"Ain't It a Shame to Go Fishin' on a Sunday"  
"Alabama Bound"
"Alberta"
"Amazing Grace"
"Army Life" (see: "I Don't Want No More of Army Life")
"Backslider, Fare Thee Well"
"Baby don't you Love me No More"
"Backwater Blues"
"Becky Dean"
"Big Fat Woman"
"Birmingham Jail"
"Black Betty" (+)
"Black Girl" (trad.)(see: "In the Pines")
"Black Snake Moan"
"Blind Lemon Blues"
"the Blood Done Signed my Names (ain't you Glad)"
"Blue Tail Fly"
"Blues Around New York"
"The Boll Weevil"
"Bottle Up and Go" (aka: "Borrow Love and Go") 
"The Bourgeois Blues"  (+)
"Bring a Little Water, Silvy"  (with Martha Ledbetter )  
"Bull Cow"
"Careless Love"
"C.C. Rider"
"Corn Bread Rough"
"Cotton Fields"
"Death Letter Blues" (parts 1&2)
"Daddy, I'm Coming Back to You"  (tribute to Jimmie Rodgers)
"Dance Calls"
"Dekalb Blues" 
"Diggin' my Potatoes" 
"Don't Lie Buddy" (with Josh White)
"Don't you Love your Daddy No More?" (trad.)
"Down in the Valley to Pray"
"Duncan and Brady" 
"Easy Rider"
"Ella Speed"
"Every Time I Feel the Spirit"
"Fannin Street (Mister Tom Hughes' Town)"
"Fiddlers Dram"
"Fort Worth and Dallas Blues"
"Four Day Worry Blues"
"Frankie and Albert" (trad.)
"The Gallows Pole"  (+)
"Get Up in the Mornin'"
"Git on Board"
"Go Down Old Hannah"
"Good Good Good"
"Good Morning Blues"
"Goodnight Irene"
"Governor O.K. Allen" 
"Governor Pat Neff"
"Green Corn"
"Grey Goose"
"Gwine Dig a Hole to Put Devil In"
"The Hindenburg Disaster" (parts 1 & 2)
"Ha Ha This A-Way"
"Ham an' Eggs"
"He Never Said a Mumblin' Word"  (trad.)
"Heaeh Mountain Stomp"
"Hitler Song"
"House of The Rising Sun"
"How Long, How Long Blues" (with Sonny Terry)
"Howard Hughes"
"If It Wasn't for Dicky"
"I Don't Want No More of Army Life"  (+)
"If You Want To Do Your Part" 
"I'm Alone Because I Love You"
"I'm on My Last Go Round"
"I'm Sorry, Mama"
"In the Pines"  (trad.)
"In dem Hot Summer Days"
"It's Tight Like That"
"In New Orleans (House of the Rising Sun)"  (trad.) (+) 
"Jean Harlow"
"Jim Crow Blues"
"John Hardy"
"John Henry"
"Join the Band"
"Julie Ann Johnson"

"Kansas City Papa"
"Keep your Hands Off Her"
"Laura"
"Leaving Blues (When you are smiling)"
"Let It Shine on Me"  (trad.)
"Line Em"
"Lining Track" (trad.)
"Little Children's Blues"
"Little Sally Walker"
"Looky Looky Yonder"  (+)
"Match Box Blues"
"Medicine Man"
"Meeting at the Building"
"Midnight Special" (trad.)
"Mister Tom Hughes's Town"
"Moanin'"
"Mother's Blues"
"Mr. Hitler"
"Must I Be Carried into the Sky"
“My Baby Quit Me”
"National Defense Blues"
"New York City"
"New Black Snake Moan"
"Nobody Knows the Trouble I've Seen"
"Noted (No Good) Rider"
"Oh, Something on My Mind"
"Old Man"
"Old Rattler"
"(Old) Stewball"
"Old Time Religion"
"On a Christmas Day"
"On a Monday"  (+)
"Out On the Western Plains" (aka: "Cow Cow Yicky Yicky Yea")
"Outshine the Sun"
"Outskirts of Town"
"Ox Drivin’ Blues"
"Packing Trunk Blues"
"Pig Meat" (with Sonny Terry - Harmonica)
"Pig Meat Papa"
"Pick a Bale of Cotton" (trad.)
"Poor Howard"
"Prayer"
"Pretty Flowers in My Backyard"  (aka: "Pretty Flower in Your Backyard") 
"The Red Cross Store Blues"
"Red River"
"Relax Your Mind"
"Ride On"
"Roberta" (parts 1 & 2) 
"Rock Island Line" 
"the Roosevelt Song"
"Run Sinners"
"Sail On, Little Girl, Sail On"
"Salty Dog"
"the Scottsboro Boys"
"Shorty George"
"Silver City Bound"
"Skip to My Lou"
"Stand Your Test in Judgement"
"Stewball"
"Sweet Mary Blues (Governor Pat Neff)"
"Swing Low, Sweet Chariot" (trad.)
"Sylvie"  
"Take a Whiff on Me"
"Take This Hammer" 
"TB Blues"
"Tell me Baby"
"They Hung Him on a Cross" (see: "He Never Said a Mumblin' Word")
"The Titanic"
"There's a Man Goin´ around Takin´ Names"
"Turn your Radio On"
"We Shall Be Free" (with Woody Guthrie)"
"We Shall Walk Thru the Valley"
"Western Plain"
"When I Was a Cowboy"
"When the Boys Were Out on the Western Plains"
"When the Train Comes Along"
"Where Did You Sleep Last Night"(trad.) (see: "In the Pines")
"Whoa Back Buck"
"Yellow Gal"
"Yellow Women's Doorbells" (see: "On a Monday")
"You Can't Lose-A Me Cholly"
"You Don't Miss Your Water"
"You Don't Know My Mind"
"You Must Have that Religion, Halleloo"

References

Lead Belly